Jon L. Belsher is an American physician and executive. He is the incumbent president and chief executive officer of UCI Medical Affiliates. Belsher took over leadership of UCI to help repair the organization after it was fined $22.5 million for healthcare fraud. Interesting....Belsher started at UCI in November 2017, yet the suit was not even filed and UCI was not aware of it until late January, 2018.  Slight prevarication? Belsher has also served as an advance representative for the White House during the Bush administration.
Previously, he was a chief medical officer of MedSpring. Belsher graduated from the Riley Institute’s Diversity Leadership Initiative.

Early life
He received his education from University of Texas Southwestern Medical School. After completing his medical degree in 1998, Belsher completed his residency from Mayo Clinic College of Medicine.

He was awarded the title of 'Chief Fellow' while doing fellowship at Mayo Clinic College of Medicine.

Career
Belsher has served as the chief of aerospace medicine for the Arizona Air National Guard’s 162nd Fighter Wing. He has also served as a lieutenant colonel and during that time he was second-in-command of the largest Air National Guard Medical Group in the United States.

He was part of the team which founded MedSpring Urgent Care in 2011. Belsher as part of MedSpring facilitated shift towards affordable urgent care centers instead of hospital emergency rooms. As a chief medical officer, he helped expand MedSpring in Illinois.

Publications

References

American physicians
Year of birth missing (living people)
Living people
University of Texas Southwestern Medical Center alumni